Utopia A.D. is The Black League's second full-length album, released in 2001 by Spinefarm Records. A music video was made of the song Rex Talionis.

Track listing
"Transit Gloria Mundi" (Jarva et al.) - 2:41
"Empiria" (Jarva et al.) - 4:59
"Voice of God" (Valanne, Jarva et al.) - 3:23
"Day One" (Jarva et al.) - 5:18
"To Suffer & to Smile" (Florida, Jarva et al.) - 5:03
"Tedium Vitae" (Valanne, Jarva et al.) - 4:03
"Harbour of Hatred" (Jarva et al.) - 6:00
"The Everlasting, Part IV" (Jarva et al.) - 3:31
"Rex Talionis" (Luttinen, Jarva et al.) - 2:24
"Blueskymagic" (Luttinen, Valanne, Jarva et al.) - 4:47
"Citizen Cain" (Florida, Jarva et al.) - 4:00
"Alfa/Omega, the Desert Song" (Jarva et al.) - 4:02
"Utopia Anno Zero" (Ranta, Luttinen, Jarva et al.) - 9:49

All lyrics by Taneli Jarva.

Personnel
Taneli Jarva — Vocals
Sir Luttinen — Drums
Maike Valanne — Guitars
Alexi Ranta — Guitars
Florida — Bass guitar
Mika Pohjola — Keyboards
Jarkko Laiho — Percussion

References

2001 albums
The Black League albums